Bløtkake is a type of layer cake from Norway. It consists of layers of sukkerbrød, or sugar bread, cream or custard, and fresh fruit. It is typically served in the summer months or around Constitution Day in Norway. The same cake is known in Sweden as gräddtårta and in Denmark as flødeskumskage.

History
The earliest known recipe for bløtkake is in a cookbook written by Helle Schrøders in Denmark in 1692. In countries outside of Norway, it is commonly referred to as torte or whipped cream cake.

Gallery

References

Layer cakes
Norwegian desserts
Swedish desserts
Danish desserts